Jemma Louise Barsby (born 4 October 1995) is an Australian cricketer who plays for Queensland Fire and Adelaide Strikers.

An all-rounder who can bowl with both hands, Barsby is the daughter of former Queensland Bulls opening batsman and coach Trevor Barsby.  She developed her ambidextrous off spin bowling skills as a child in her backyard, with assistance from her brother and encouragement from her father, and also has a penchant for switch hitting while batting.
 
In October 2010, Barsby made her debut for Queensland Fire, after touring with the Shooting Stars squad.  She has been a member of the Brisbane Heat squad since its inaugural WBBL01 season (2015–16).  As she was preparing for that inaugural season, she started experiencing shoulder pain and later numbness in her fingers; after testing, she was diagnosed with multiple sclerosis.

Barsby and her Brisbane Heat teammates have since participated in charity events for MS Queensland.  , her MS symptoms were still mild; she was on daily medication, and was also using an ice vest on really hot days.

In November 2018, she was named in Brisbane Heat's squad for the 2018–19 Women's Big Bash League season.  In October 2019, she signed  with Perth Scorchers and in six games, averaged 21.25 with the bat and 37.00 with the ball.

References

External links

Jemma Barsby at Cricket Australia

1995 births
Australian women cricketers
Brisbane Heat (WBBL) cricketers
Cricketers from Brisbane
Living people
People with multiple sclerosis
Perth Scorchers (WBBL) cricketers
Queensland Fire cricketers
South Australian Scorpions cricketers
Adelaide Strikers (WBBL) cricketers
Sportswomen from Queensland